The Slave Girl is a 1915 American short silent Western film directed by Tod Browning and starring Elmo Lincoln.

Cast
 Elmo Lincoln as Bob West (billed as Otto Lincoln)
 Teddy Sampson as Daughter
 W. E. Lawrence as Fred Gilbert
 Mary Alden as Sally
 Miriam Cooper
 Jennie Lee

References

External links
 

1915 films
1915 Western (genre) films
1915 short films
American silent short films
American black-and-white films
Films directed by Tod Browning
Silent American Western (genre) films
1910s American films
1910s English-language films